The Zanaga mine is a large iron mine located in the western part of the Republic of the Congo in Zanaga, Lékoumou Department. Zanaga represents one of the largest iron ore reserves in the Republic of the Congo and in the world having estimated reserves of 6.8 billion tonnes of ore grading 32% iron metal.

References 

Iron mines in the Republic of the Congo